Numismatics is the study or collection of currency,  including coins, tokens, paper money, medals and related objects.

Specialists, known as numismatists, are often characterized as students or collectors of coins, but the discipline also includes the broader study of money and other means of payment used to resolve debts and exchange goods.

The earliest forms of money used by people are categorised by collectors as "odd and curious", but the use of other goods in barter exchange is excluded, even where used as a circulating currency (e.g., cigarettes or instant noodles in prison). As an example, the Kyrgyz people used horses as the principal currency unit, and gave small change in lambskins; the lambskins may be suitable for numismatic study, but the horses are not. Many objects have been used for centuries, such as cowry shells, precious metals, cocoa beans, large stones, and gems.

Etymology
First attested in English 1829, the word numismatics comes from the adjective numismatic, meaning "of coins". It was borrowed in 1792 from French numismatique, itself a derivation from Late Latin numismatis, genitive of numisma, a variant of nomisma meaning "coin". Nomisma is a latinisation of the Greek νόμισμα (nomisma) which means "current coin/custom", which derives from νομίζειν (nomizein), "to hold or own as a custom or usage, to use customarily", in turn from νόμος (nomos), "usage, custom", ultimately from νέμειν (nemein), "to dispense, divide, assign, keep, hold".

History of money

Throughout its history, money itself has been made to be a scarce good, although it does not have to be. Many materials have been used to form money, from naturally scarce precious metals and cowry shells through cigarettes to entirely artificial money, called fiat money, such as banknotes. Many complementary currencies use time as a unit of measure, using mutual credit accounting that keeps the balance of money intact.

Modern money (and most ancient money too) is essentially a token – an abstraction. Paper currency is perhaps the most common type of physical money today.  However, goods such as gold or silver retain many of the essential properties of money, such as price fluctuation and limited supply. However, these goods are not controlled by one single authority.

History of numismatics

Coin collecting may have possibly existed in ancient times. Caesar Augustus gave "coins of every device, including old pieces of the kings and foreign money" as Saturnalia gifts.

Petrarch, who wrote in a letter that he was often approached by vinediggers with old coins asking him to buy or to identify the ruler,  is credited as the first Renaissance collector.  Petrarch presented a collection of Roman coins to Emperor Charles IV in 1355.

The first book on coins was De Asse et Partibus (1514) by Guillaume Budé.  During the early Renaissance ancient coins were collected by European royalty and nobility.  Collectors of coins were Pope Boniface VIII, Emperor Maximilian of the Holy Roman Empire, Louis XIV of France, Ferdinand I, Elector Joachim II of Brandenburg who started the Berlin coin cabinet and Henry IV of France to name a few.  Numismatics is called the "Hobby of Kings", due to its most esteemed founders.

Professional societies organised in the 19th century. The Royal Numismatic Society was founded in 1836 and immediately began publishing the journal that became the Numismatic Chronicle. The American Numismatic Society was founded in 1858 and began publishing the American Journal of Numismatics in 1866.

In 1931 the British Academy launched the Sylloge Nummorum Graecorum publishing collections of Ancient Greek coinage.  The first volume of Sylloge of Coins of the British Isles was published in 1958.

In the 20th century coins gained recognition as archaeological objects, scholars such as Guido Bruck of the Kunsthistorisches Museum in Vienna realized their value in providing a temporal context and the difficulty that curators faced when identifying worn coins using classical literature. After World War II in Germany a project, Fundmünzen der Antike (Coin finds of the Classical Period) was launched, to register every coin found within Germany. This idea found successors in many countries.

In the United States, the US mint established a coin cabinet in 1838 when chief coiner Adam Eckfeldt donated his personal collection.  William E. Du Bois' Pledges of History... (1846) describes the cabinet.

C. Wyllys Betts' American colonial history illustrated by contemporary medals (1894) set the groundwork for the study of American historical medals.

Helen Wang's "A short history of Chinese numismatics in European languages" (2012-2013) gives an outline history of Western countries' understanding of Chinese numismatics. Lyce Jankowski's Les amis des monnaies is an in-depth study of Chinese numismatics in China in the 19th century.

Modern numismatics

Modern numismatics is the study of the coins of the mid-17th century onward, the period of machine-struck coins. Their study serves more the need of collectors than historians and it is more often successfully pursued by amateur aficionados than by professional scholars. The focus of modern numismatics lies frequently in the research of production and use of money in historical contexts using mint or other records in order to determine the relative rarity of the coins they study. Varieties, mint-made errors, the results of progressive die wear, mintage figures and even the sociopolitical context of coin mintings are also matters of interest.

Subfields

Exonumia (UK English: Paranumismatica) is the study of coin-like objects such as token coins and medals, and other items used in place of legal currency or for commemoration. This includes elongated coins, encased coins, souvenir medallions, tags, badges, counterstamped coins, wooden nickels, credit cards, and other similar items. It is related to numismatics proper (concerned with coins which have been legal tender), and many coin collectors are also exonumists.

Notaphily is the study of paper money or banknotes.
It is believed that people have been collecting paper money for as long as it has been in use. However, people only started collecting paper money systematically in Germany in the 1920s, particularly the Serienscheine (Series notes) Notgeld. The turning point occurred in the 1970s, when notaphily was established as a separate area by collectors.
At the same time, some developed countries such as the United States, Germany and France began publishing their respective national catalogues of paper money, which represented major points of reference literature.

Scripophily is the study and collection of stocks and bonds. It is an area of collecting due to both the inherent beauty of some historical documents as well as the interesting historical context of each document. Some stock certificates are excellent examples of engraving.  Occasionally, an old stock document will be found that still has value as a stock in a successor company.

The example of one of Alexander the Great's coin 
The example of the silver tetradrachm found in Byblos (ca 330-300 bc.) is indicative of Macedonian influence. Alexander's coin (To nomisma Alexandrou) is of the type of the head of beardless Heracles, with an aquiline nose on the right, represented with a headdress of lion's head and, on the reverse side, an aetophore Zeus (holding an eagle) enthroned with a scepter in his left hand. The type of this tetradrachm has a very assertive Macedonian and Greek character. The choice of representations is symbolic : the reminder of his divine lineage and his heroic character. The representation of the Olympian god and the Greek hero also makes it possible to spread the Greco-Macedonian culture and in particular religious cults. The silver minting inaugurated by Alexander in -333 showed representations which, while privileging the Greco-Macedonian aspect of the divinites, did not appear to the Orientals as totally foreign (assimilated to the Baals deities).

See also

 Awards for numismatics
 Glossary of numismatics
 Numismatic associations
 List of numismatic collections
 List of numismatic journals
 List of numismatists

Further reading
 Pritsak, O. (1998). The Origins of the Old Rus’ Weights and Monetary Systems: Two Studies in Western Eurasian Metrology and Numismatics in the Seventh to Eleventh Centuries (Harvard Series In Ukrainian Studies). Cambridge: Harvard Ukrainian Research Institute.

References

External links

 
Currency